Nalini Malani (born 19 February 1946) is a contemporary Indian artist widely acknowledged to be among the country's first generation of video artists. She works with several mediums which include theater, videos, installations along with mixed media paintings and drawings. The subjects of her creations are deeply influenced by her experience of migration in the aftermath of the partition of India. Subsequently, pressing feminist issues have also become a part of her creative output. Malani has evolved a visual language that is iconic, moving from stop motion, erasure animations, reverse paintings and most recently to digital animations, where she draws directly with her finger onto a tablet.

Malani made her first video work 'Dream Houses' (1969), as the youngest and only female participant of the Vision Exchange Workshop (VIEW), an experimental multi-disciplinary artist workshop in Bombay (Mumbai) by late artist Akbar Padamsee.

Her works have been showcased at renowned museums across the world, including the Stedelijk Museum in Amsterdam and the Museum of Modern Art in New York.

Early life and education
Malani is the only child of Satni Advani (Sindhi Sikh) and Jairam Malani (Theosophist). Born in Karachi (Sindh) in what was then British India (now Pakistan) in 1946, Malani's family sought refuge in India during the partition of India. They relocated to Kolkata (then Calcutta), where her father worked with Tata Airlines (later Air India) and relocated to Mumbai in 1954, where they lived in a colony built for displaced Sindhis. Her family's experience of leaving behind their home and becoming refugees deeply informs Malani's artworks.

Malani studied Fine Arts in Mumbai and obtained a Diploma in Fine Arts from Sir Jamsetjee Jeejebhoy School of Art in 1969. From 1964-67, she had a studio at the Bhulabhai Desai Memorial Institute, which used to be located at Breach Candy, Mumbai (then Bombay), where artists, musicians, dancers and theater persons worked individually and collectively. It was here that she had the opportunity to meet and collaborate with artists from allied forms of artistic practice like theatre. She received a scholarship from the French Government to study fine arts in Paris from 1970 to 1972. She was also a recipient of two scholarships from the Government of India, as well as a grant in 1989 for travel and work in the United States.

Career

After her graduation, she spent a few years working with photography and film. The themes she explored during this period dealt with the turbulent time that India was experiencing politically and socially, as well the deepening literacy of moving image by its population. In the initial part of her career, Malani mostly focused on paintings - acrylic on canvas & watercolour on paper. She produced a realistic socially based portrayal of Contemporary India. She continued to explore techniques such as the reverse painting method (taught to her in the late-80s by Bhupen Khakhar), which she would recurrently use in her future work. She was disappointed with the lack of acknowledgement that women artists had to face in India and resolved to bring them together for a group show to promote the sense of solidarity. In 1985, she curated the first exhibition of Indian female artists, in Delhi. This led to a series of traveling exhibitions that were taken to public spaces as an attempt to go beyond the elitist atmosphere of the art gallery.

The sectarian violence that hit India in the early 1990s after the demolition of the Babri Masjid triggered a sudden shift in her artwork. The renewed religious conflict that had proven to be recurring (bringing back memories of the Partition) pushed her artistic endeavours past the boundaries of the surface and into space. Her earlier foray into performance art and her keen interest in Literature brought new dimensions to her art. She is often counted amongst the earliest to transition from traditional painting to new media work.

In 2013, she became the first Asian woman to receive the Arts & Culture Fukuoka Prize for her "consistent focus on such daring contemporary and universal themes as religious conflict, war, oppression of women and environmental destruction."

Notable works

For two-dimensional works, she uses both oil paintings and watercolors. Her other inspirations are her visions from the realm of memory, myth and desire. The rapid brush style evokes dreams and fantasies. Malani's video and installation work allowed her to shift from strictly real space to a combination of real space and virtual space, moving away from strictly object-based work. Her video work often references divisions, gender, and cyborgs. Malani roots her identity as female and as Indian, and her work might be understood as a way for her identity to confront the rest of the world. She often references Greek and Hindu mythology in her work. The characters of 'destroyed women' like Medea, Cassandra and Sita feature often in her narrative. Her multifaceted oeuvre can be broadly classified under two categories; Her experiments with visual media and the moving image like Utopia (1969-1976), Mother India (2005), In Search of Vanished Blood (2012); Her ephemeral and in-situ works such as City of Desires (1992), Medea as Mutant (1993/2014), The Tables have turned (2008). Although her work talks of violence and conflict, her main intent is collective catharsis.

Dream Houses (1969) 
Malani's first experimental film made at the pioneering Vision Exchange Workshop (VIEW) — the brainchild of late artist Akbar Padamsee — drew inspiration from utopian modern Indian architecture. Made using cutting edge photographic equipment available at the Workshop, it features an exciting use of a cardboard maquette, different light sources, primary colour filters, and a Mamiyaflex camera. For this path-breaking work, Malani drew on the 'ideological possibilities of modern architecture', looking to the work of renowned architects Charles Correa and Buckminster Fuller, and blending in her learnings from Johannes Itten's colour theories along with Moholy-Nagy’s Vision in Motion."The subject of Dream Houses is the idealism and hope that modernism brought during the Nehruvian period, in which poverty and housing problems in modern India could be solved through a master plan for urban space." — Nalini Malani 'Dream Houses' was shown at the Kiran Nadar Museum of Art (KNMA) (2014), the Goethe Institute, Mumbai, (2019) and the MoMa, New York,(2022), after being 'lost' for over 50 years.

Unity in Diversity (2003) 
Malani's 2003 video play, Unity in Diversity, is based on the renowned 19th century Indian painter Raja Ravi Varma's Galaxy of Musicians, with the overt theme of nationalistic unity displayed through the garb of eleven musicians from different parts of India seemingly playing in harmony. Malani makes a statement on this idealized version of unity by incorporating later histories of violence into that image.

Mother India (2005) 
The video installation was inspired by an essay by the sociologist Veena Das titled "Language and Body: Transactions in the Construction of Pain". It is a synchronised five screen wall-to-wall projection combines archival footage with poetic and painterly image to tell the story of how Indian Nationalism was built using the bodies of women as metaphors for the nation. The work speaks of women as "mutant, de-gendered and violated beyond imagination." The Partition of India and the Gujarat Riots of 2002 are the central events that are referenced in this installation, as there was a sharp increase in the violation of women in these periods.

In Search of Vanished Blood (2012) 
This installation which was first produced for the 13th edition of Documenta consists of five larger rotating Mylar cylinders (metaphorically referring to Buddhist prayer wheels) reverse painted with images of soldiers, animals, gods and guns. The shadow play caused by this rotation tells the story of senseless bloodshed especially narrating the story of India since the partition and highlighting the plight of the dispossessed/tribal communities whose lives are drastically affected by developmental decisions made by the government.

Exhibitions 
 1993 - Medea, Goethe-Institut Max Mueller Bhavan, Bombay (now Mumbai), India
 1996 - Medea, Goethe-Institut Max Mueller Bhavan, Mumbai, India
 1997 - The Job, Goethe-Institut Max Mueller Bhavan, Mumbai, India
 1999 - Remembering Toba Tek Singh, Prince of Wales Museum (now Chhatrapati Shivaji Maharaj Vastu Sangrahalaya), Mumbai, India
 2002 - Hamletmachine, New Museum of Contemporary Art, New York, USA
2005 - Exposing the Source: The Painting of Nalini Malani, Peabody Essex Museum, Massachusetts, USA
2007 - Nalini Malani, Irish Museum of Modern Art, Dublin, Ireland
 2009 - Nalini Malani, Govett-Brewster Art Gallery, New Plymouth, New Zealand
 2010 - Splitting the Other, Musée Cantonal des Beaux-Arts, Lausanne, Switzerland
2012 - Mother India: Videoplays by Nalini Malani, Art Gallery of New South Wales, Sydney, Australia
 2013 - Listening to the Shades, Centre de la Gravure, La Louvière, Belgium
 2013 -  Listening to the Shades, Dr Bhau Daji Lad Mumbai City Museum, Mumbai, India
 2014 - You can't keep Acid in a Paper Bag, Kiran Nadar Museum of Art, New Delhi, India

 2014 - In Search of Vanished Blood, co-commissioned by Edinburgh Art Festival and 14-18 Now, WW1 Centenary Art commissions, Scottish National Gallery of Modern Art, Edinburgh, United Kingdom
 2014 - Engadiner Museum, St. Moritz, Switzerland
 2014 - Transgressions, Asia Society Museum, New York, USA
 2015 - Stories Untold, Institute of Contemporary Art Indian Ocean, Port-Louis, Mauritius
 2016 - In Search of Vanished Blood, Institute of Contemporary Art, Boston, USA
 2017 - Transgressions, Stedelijk Museum, Amsterdam, Netherlands
 2017/18 - The Rebellion of the Dead: Retrospective 1969-2018 Part I, Centre Pompidou, Paris, France
 2018 - The Rebellion of the Dead: Retrospective 1968-2018 Part II, Castello di Rivoli, Turin, Italy
 2019 - Can You Hear Me?, Goethe Institut Max Mueller Bhavan, Mumbai, India
 2020 - The Witness, Dr. Bhau Daji Lad Mumbai City Museum, Mumbai, India
 2020 - You Don't Hear Me, Miró Foundation, Barcelona, Spain
 2020 - Can You Hear Me?, Whitechapel Gallery, London, UK
 2020 - Utopia!?, Serralves Museum of Contemporary Art, Porto, Portugal
 2021 - Can You Hear Me?, Centro de Arte Contemporáneo de Málaga, Spain

Through the Looking Glass 
From 1987 - 89, Malani organised 'Through The Looking Glass' with her contemporaries, the women artists Madhvi Parekh, Nilima Sheikh, and Arpita Singh. The exhibition, featuring works by all four artists, travelled to five non-commercial venues across India. Inspired by a meeting in 1979 with Nancy Spero, May Stevens and Ana Mendieta at the AIR Gallery in New York (the first all-female artists’ cooperative gallery in the US), Malani had planned to organise an exhibition entirely of works by women artists, which failed to materialise due to lack of interest and support.

Reception

Awards 
 1970-72: French Government Scholarship for Fine Arts Study in Paris
 2010: Honorary Doctorate in Fine Arts, San Francisco Art Institute, USA
 2013: Fukuoka Arts and Culture Prize for Contemporary Art, Fukuoka, Japan
 2014: St. Moritz Art Masters Lifetime Achievement Award, St. Moritz, Switzerland
 2016: Asia Arts Game Changer, Asia Society, Hong Kong
 2019: Joan Miró Prize, Fundació Joan Miró, Barcelona, Spain

Fellowships 

 1984-89: Art Research Fellowship, Government of India
 1989: USIA Fellowship, Fine Arts Work Center, Provincetown, Massachusetts, USA
 2020: Contemporary Fellowship, National Gallery, London, UK

Residencies 

 1988: Kasauli Art Centre, Kasauli, India
 1999: Lasalle-SIA, Singapore
 1999-2000: Fukuoka Asian Art Museum, Fukuoka, Japan
 2003: Civitella Ranieri, Umbertide, Italy
 2005: Lucas Art Residencies, Montalvo, California, USA

Collections 

 Dr. Bhau Daji Lad Museum, Mumbai 
 Jehangir Nicholson Art Foundation (JNAF), Mumbai 
 Lalit Kala Akademi, New Delhi 
 National Gallery of Modern Art (NGMA), New Delhi
 MoMa The Museum of Modern Art, New York 
 Queensland Art Gallery | Gallery of Modern Art, Brisbane, Australia 
 Tata Institute of Fundamental Research (TIFR), Mumbai 
 Tate, Britain

References

Further reading 

 Nalini Malani: Paintings and Photograms, Pundole Art Gallery, Bombay 1970
 Nalini Malani, Pundole Art Gallery, Bombay 1973 (text by A. Jussawalla).
 Nalini Malani, Pundole Art Gallery, Bombay 1979 (interview by Y. Dalmia).
 Nalini Malani, Art Heritage, New Delhi 1980 (text by G. Kapur).
 Nalini Malani, Pundole Art Gallery, Bombay 1984 (text by A. Sinha).
 Nalini Malani, Pundole Art Gallery, Bombay 1986 (text by P. Kurien).
 Nalini Malani, Gallery 7, Bombay 1990 (text by S. Gokhale).
 Nalini Malani, Gallery Chemould, Bombay 1991 (with text by the artist)
 Nalini Malani, Hieroglyph’s & Other Works, Painted Books, Installation, Sakshi Gallery, Madras 1992 (text by A. Rajadhyaksha).
 Nalini Malani: Bloodlines, Artist’s Laboratory, Gallery Chemould, Bombay 1995 (with text by the artist).
 Nalini Malani: Containers ’96: Art Across the Oceans, Copenhagen Cultural Capital Foundation, Copenhagen 1996 (interview by K. Kapoor).
 Nalini Malani: Medeaprojekt, edited by K. Kapoor and A. Desai, Max Mueller Bhavan, Bombay 1997 (texts by K. Kapoor, C. Sambrani, A. Rajadhyaksha, A. Samarth, interview by S. Gokhale).
 Nalini Malani: Hamletmachine, edited by J. Matsuura, M. Kamachi, Fukuoka Asian Art Museum, Fukuoka 2000 (with text by the artist).
 Nalini Malani: Stories Retold, Bose Pacia, New York 2004 (texts by di R. Devenport, C. Sambrani).
 Nalini Malani: Living in Alice Time, Sakshi Gallery, Bombay 2006 (texts by N. Adajania, S. Bean).
 Nalini Malani, edited by S. Kissáne, J. Pijnappel, Irish Museum of Modern Art, Dublin, Charta, Milan 2007 (texts by E. Juncosa, T. McEvilley, C. Sambrani, interview by J. Pijnappel, with texts by the artist).
 Nalini Malani: Listening to the Shades, edited by J. Pijnappel, Arario Gallery, New York, Charta, Milan 2008 (text by R. Storr, with text by the artist).
 Nalini Malani: Splitting the Other, edited by B. Fibicher, Musée cantonal des Beaux-Arts, Lausanne, Hatje Cantz Verlag, Ostfildern 2010 (texts by B. Fibicher, W. Chadwick, D. von Drahten, A. Huyssen)
 Nalini Malani: In Search of Vanished Blood, edited by Z. Colah, J. Pijnappel, dOCUMENTA (13), Kassel, Hatje Cantz Verlag, Ostfildern 2012 (texts by A. Huyssen, J. Pijnappel, N. Malani in conversation with C. Christov-Bakargiev, N. Malani in conversation with A. Appadurai).
 Nalini Malani: Womantime, Art Musings, Bombay 2013 (text by A. Doshi).
 Nalini Malani & Arjun Appadurai: The Morality of Refusal, edited by K. Sauerlander, dOCUMENTA (13), Kassel, Hatje Cantz Verlag, Ostfildern 2012 (text by A. Appadurai).
 Nalini Malani, Artist File 2013, edited by O. Fukunaga, National Art Centre, Tokyo 2013 (text by Y. Motohashi).
William Kentridge-Nalini Malani: The Shadow play as Medium of Memory, edited by C. Gute, Galerie Lelong, New York, Charta, Milan 2013 (text by A. Huyssen).
 Nalini Malani: Cassandra’s Gift, edited by V. Shivadas, Vadehra Art Gallery, New Delhi 2014 (text by V. Shivadas).
 Nalini Malani: You can’t hold Acid in a Paper Bag (Retrospective 1969-2014), edited L. Betting, S. Bhatt, J. Pijnappel, Kiran Nadar Museum of Art, New Delhi 2015 (texts by R. Karode, S. Jhaveri, C. Sambrani, A. Rajadhyaksha, R. Devenport, D. von Drathen. - interview by S. Jhaveri).
M. Bal, In Medias Res: Inside Nalini Malani’s Shadow Plays, edited by K. Tengbergen-Moyes, Hatje Cantz Verlag, Ostfildern 2016.
 Nalini Malani: The Rebellion of the Dead, Part I 1969-2018, edited by S. Duplaix, Centre Georges Pompidou, Museé national d’art modern, Paris, Éditions du Centre Pompidou, Paris, Hatje Cantz Verlag, Ostfildern 2017 (texts by S. Duplaix, M. Bal, J. Pijnappel, interview by S. Duplaix).
 Nalini Malani: The Rebellion of the Dead, Part II 1969-2018, edited by M. Beccaria, Castello di Rivoli Museo d’Arte Contemporanea, Rivoli, Hatje Cantz Verlag, Ostfildern 2018 (texts by C. Christov-Bakargiev, M. Bal, M. Beccaria, L. Monnet, interview by M. Beccaria).
 Nalini Malani: Can You Hear Me?, edited by Johan Pijnappel, Max Mueller Bhavan, Mumbai 2019 (with text by the artist).
 Nalini Malani: Can You Hear Me?, edited by Emily Butler, Whitechapel Gallery, London 2020 (texts Iwona Blazwick, Emily Butler, with text by the artist).

External links 

 Official website
 Profile on Google Arts & Culture

1946 births
Living people
Women artists from West Bengal
Artists from Karachi
Sindhi people
20th-century Indian painters
Artists from Kolkata
20th-century Indian women artists
Artists from Mumbai
Religious artists
Indian women contemporary artists
Sir Jamsetjee Jeejebhoy School of Art alumni